Rabbi Naftali Tzvi Halberstam (1931–2005) was the Grand Rebbe of Bobov from August 2000 until March 2005. He succeeded his father, Shlomo Halberstam (1907–2000), as Grand Rebbe of Bobov.

Early life
Naftali Tzvi Halberstam was born in Bobowa, Poland in 1931 (25 Sivan, 5691) to Shlomo Halberstam, the third Bobover Rebbe. His mother and two siblings were murdered in the Holocaust, and after the war, Naftali's father Shlomo had arranged for him to go to Mandatory Palestine. Shlomo remained in Europe, and Naftali was unsure if his father had survived the war.

Post-war
Naftali Tzvi Halberstam lived for several years in Israel, where he received his rabbinical ordination. In 1951, after discovering that his father had survived the war and relocated to New York in the late 1940s, he joined him there. Upon his father's death in 2000, he became the Grand Rebbe of Bobov in Borough Park, Brooklyn. He died on March 23, 2005 (12 Adar, 5765).Rabbi Naftali  Halberstam was buried next to his father in Floral Park Cemetery, New Jersey.

Rabbi Naftali Halberstam's wife, Rebbetzin Hesa, died on May 15, 2011 (11 Iyar, 5771) aged 80.

Rabbi Naftali Halberstam left no sons, only two daughters. His older daughter is married to Yehoshua Rubin, the current Bobov-45 dayan (judge). His younger daughter is married to the first Bobov-45 Rebbe, Rabbi Mordechai Dovid Unger Shlita.

Rebbes of Bobov
 Shlomo Halberstam (1847–1905) grandson of the Sanzer Rebbe, Chaim Halberstam
 Ben Zion Halberstam (1874–1941)
 Shlomo Halberstam (1907–2000)
 Naftali Halberstam (1931–2005)
 Ben Zion Aryeh Leibish Halberstam (b.1955), current Rebbe, younger son of Shlomo Halberstam

See also
 Satmar succession feud
 Klausenburg (Hasidic dynasty)
 Ropshitz (Hasidic dynasty)
 Sanz (Hasidic dynasty)

References

External links
 Wedding video with Grand Rabbi Naftali Halberstam - Part 1, Part 2
 Several Thousand Attend Grand Rabbi's Funeral in Brooklyn March 24, 2005

Rebbes of Bobov
American Hasidic rabbis
Polish Hasidic rabbis
Hasidic rabbis in Europe
Hasidic rabbis in Israel
Jews from Galicia (Eastern Europe)
1931 births
2005 deaths
Holocaust survivors
People from Borough Park, Brooklyn
Descendants of the Baal Shem Tov